Arnøy Church is a parish church of the Church of Norway in Skjervøy Municipality in Troms og Finnmark county, Norway. It is located in the village of Arnøyhamn on the island of Arnøya. It is one of the two churches for the Skjervøy parish which is part of the Nord-Troms prosti (deanery) in the Diocese of Nord-Hålogaland. The brown, wooden church was built in a long church style in 1978 using plans drawn up by the architect Harry Gangvik. The church seats about 250 people.

See also
List of churches in Nord-Hålogaland

References

Skjervøy
Churches in Troms
Wooden churches in Norway
20th-century Church of Norway church buildings
Churches completed in 1978
1978 establishments in Norway
Long churches in Norway